Jasper Harvey (born April 8, 1983) is a former American football offensive lineman. He was signed by the Washington Redskins as an undrafted free agent in 2006. He played college football at San Diego State.

Harvey was also a member of the Philadelphia Eagles, Berlin Thunder, Orlando Predators, Arizona Cardinals, New York Sentinels and San Jose SaberCats.

Professional career
Harvey was drafted by the New York Sentinels of the United Football League in the UFL Premiere Season Draft. He signed with the team on September 9, 2009.

References

External links
Arizona Cardinals bio
Orlando Predators bio
San Diego State Aztecs bio

1983 births
Living people
Players of American football from New Orleans
American football centers
San Diego State Aztecs football players
Washington Redskins players
Philadelphia Eagles players
Berlin Thunder players
Orlando Predators players
Arizona Cardinals players
New York Sentinels players
San Jose SaberCats players
San Jose SaberCats coaches